Liberty Christian Academy (LCA, founded as Lynchburg Christian Academy) is a private Christian school in Lynchburg, Virginia. Founded in 1967 by Baptist preacher Jerry Falwell Sr. as a ministry of Thomas Road Baptist Church and a segregation academy, the school is recognized as an educational facility by the Commonwealth of Virginia through the Virginia State Board of Education, Southern Association of Colleges and Schools, and the Association of Christian Schools International. The academy consists of pre–K through grade 12.

History
During the 1950s and 1960s, Falwell spoke and campaigned against civil rights movement leader Martin Luther King Jr. and the desegregation of public school systems by the U.S. federal government. In 1966, he led the effort to create "a private school for white students," the Lynchburg News reported. Named Lynchburg Christian Academy, the school opened in 1967 as a segregation academy. Falwell developed it as a ministry of his Thomas Road Baptist Church.

Unlike many other segregation academies, the school became racially integrated two years after its opening. The historian Seth Dowland said that school officials later sought to market the school to parents who were not solely motivated by a desire to keep their children out of racially integrated public schools.

In 1975, the Ford administration began trying to deny segregation academies their tax-exempt status on the basis that they perpetuated segregation. In 1979, Falwell denounced this "intervention against Christian schools", which had become a policy of the Carter administration. He launched the Moral Majority political action committee to aid the U.S. Conference of Catholic Bishops protest against legal abortion in the United States, according to Heritage Foundation co-founder Paul Weyrich.

In 2005, the Lynchburg Christian Academy was moved next to Liberty University and renamed Liberty Christian Academy.

Athletics
The LCA football team compiled an 85–6 record, winning four state championships and eight conference championships, between 2004, when Frank Rocco become the head coach, and 2013. Among the team's former members are Rashad Jennings and Bobby Massie.

References

External links

 Liberty Christian Academy

Baptist schools in the United States
Christian schools in Virginia
Educational institutions established in 1967
Private K-12 schools in Virginia
Schools in Lynchburg, Virginia
Segregation academies in Virginia
Conservatism in the United States
Jerry Falwell